Darneh may refer to:

 Darnah Governorate, a former Governorate in Libya
 Doraneh, also spelled Darneh, a village in Iran
 Darneh, Kermanshah, a village in Iran